Cesar Francesco Barone (born Adolph James Rode; December 4, 1960 – December 24, 2009) was an American serial killer. He was sentenced to death in 1995 for assaulting and killing four women in the Portland area between 1991 and 1993. However, he died awaiting execution in 2009.

Early criminal activity 
Adolph James Rode was born in Fort Lauderdale, Florida on December 4, 1960. When he was three, his mother left the household to live with another man; his parents divorced the following year and Rode was raised by his father and his new wife.

At the age of fifteen, he entered the home of Alice Stock, a neighbour in her seventies, threatening her with a knife and ordering her to undress: she refused and Rode left the scene. For his aggression and other acts of delinquency, he was placed in a center for problematic adolescents. As soon as he was released, he was back to his old lifestyle. A violent and antisocial teenager, Rode became a regular consumer of various drugs and alcohol (Methaqualone, cocaine, LSD, etc.), and committed new burglaries and assaults until he was arrested in 1977; he was then sentenced to two years in prison. Released in November 1979, he later tried to break into the home of his former stepmother, who managed to escape.

Later criminal activity 

In 1980, now under the name Cesar Francesco Barone, he was sentenced again for several burglaries and imprisoned. During his incarceration at Cross City Prison in Florida, he assaulted a female prison guard and tried to rape her: he was then transferred to the Florida State Prison in Starke, where he met Ted Bundy, a serial killer.

Released in 1987 after seven years in detention, he moved to Washington state with his girlfriend Kathi Scarbrough, whom he met in prison. Shortly after, Adolph James Rode decided to rename himself Cesar Francesco Barone. In 1988, Cesar and Kathi married and moved to Hillsboro, in Oregon.

In 1989, unable to keep a job (he changed employers six times in a few months), Cesar Barone decided to join the army. He received a qualification of "good shooter" with the M16, the parachutist and first aid badges. In December of that same year, he participated in the US invasion of Panama, and later said that he had killed many Panamanians, both civilian and military. In 1990, he was accused of exposing himself to a female officer and eventually was kicked out of the army after his superiors learned that he had changed his identity and had spent several years in prison.

Murders  

From 1991 to 1993, Cesar Barone killed at least four women around Portland, as well as sexually assaulting another three during that same period without killing them. It is suspected that he had more victims.

Barone was arrested on February 27, 1993, and was sentenced to death in 1995.

On December 24, 2009, Cesar Barone died of cancer at the Oregon State Penitentiary in Salem, after spending several weeks in the medical section of the prison.

List of known victims

See also 
 Capital punishment in Oregon
 List of serial killers in the United States

Notes and references

Bibliography 
 Don Lasseter, Dead of Night : The True Story of a Serial Killer, Dutton / Signet, 1999.

External links 
  « Cesar Barone : Portrait » on tueursenserie.org

1960 births
2009 deaths
American people who died in prison custody
American prisoners sentenced to death
American rapists
American serial killers
Male serial killers
People from Hillsboro, Oregon
Prisoners sentenced to death by Oregon
Prisoners who died in Oregon detention
Serial killers who died in prison custody
United States Army soldiers